Daryna Verkhohliad (born 22 February 1992 in Velyka Oleksandrivka, Kherson Oblast) is a Ukrainian rower.

References 
 

1992 births
Living people
Ukrainian female rowers
Sportspeople from Kherson Oblast
Olympic rowers of Ukraine
Rowers at the 2016 Summer Olympics
Universiade bronze medalists for Ukraine
Universiade medalists in rowing
Medalists at the 2013 Summer Universiade
Medalists at the 2015 Summer Universiade
21st-century Ukrainian women